Jason and Marceline is a 1986 young adult novel by Jerry Spinelli. It is the sequel to Space Station Seventh Grade.

Plot summary
Jason Herkimer, the main character of Space Station Seventh Grade, is now in ninth grade. His relationship with his friend Marceline McAllister has developed into a real romance. The only trouble is that Jason isn't quite sure what to do with a girlfriend. His friends insist that the main function of a girlfriend is to make out, but Marceline says there's more to life than that.

Characters
Jason Herkimer: The main protagonist. Now in ninth grade, and in a relationship with Marceline McAllister.

Marceline McAllister: Jason's girlfriend. She wants Jason to be himself, not who his friends want him to be.

The Gang: Jason's group of wild friends who enjoy drinking, smoking, girls, and parties, some things Jason is not too comfortable with.

External links
Author Jerry Spinelli's homepage 

1986 American novels
Novels by Jerry Spinelli
American young adult novels